Pierre-Henry Maccioni (born 14 May 1948 in Saint-Denis, Réunion) is a French civil servant.

Career
 1970–1972: sub-prefect of Fontenay-le-Comte, Vendée, Pays de la Loire.
 1 March 1982 – 1984: sub-prefect of Calvi, Haute-Corse, Corsica.
 1984–1987: Secretary General of prefecture of Dordogne.
 1988: Chef de cabinet (principal private secretary) to Roland Dumas (Foreign Minister).
 9 March 1990 – 1993: sub-prefect of L'Haÿ-les-Roses, Val-de-Marne, Île-de-France.
 1 October 1997 – 2001: prefect of Dordogne in Périgueux.
 12 February 2001 – 2004: prefect of Saône-et-Loire in Mâcon.
 7 January 2004 – 2006: prefect of Côtes-d'Armor in Saint-Brieuc.
 2010 : prefect of Val-d'Oise.
 On 16 January 2013: prefect of Upper Normandy region and prefect of Seine-Maritime in Rouen.

Honours and awards
: Commandeur of Légion d'honneur (New Year 2013 promotion).

References
  “Maccioni, Pierre-Henry” (born in 1948), page 1435 in Who's Who in France : Dictionnaire biographique de personnalités françaises vivant en France et à l'étranger, et de personnalités étrangères résidant en France, 44th edition for 2013 edited in 2012, 2371 p., 31 cm,  .
  http://www.whoswho.fr/bio/pierre-henry-maccioni_26664 : Who’s is Who in France on line (access restricted: fee)
  http://www.francophonie-avenir.com/Index_DDP_Pierre-Henry_Maccioni,_un_prefet_angliciseur.htm : 2005 when he was prefect of Côtes-d'Armor.  Retrieved on 19 February 2013.
  http://ambafrance-mu.org/spip.php?page=mobile_art&art=410 Site of French Ambassy in Maurice : Interview with prefect of Réunion Pierre-Henry Maccioni by Jean-Marc Poché, 17 Novembre 2007. Retrieved on 19 February 2013.
   Keys of jail of Domenjod, Réunion given to the prefect : 16 October 2008. Retrieved on 17 February 2013 (access restricted).

Notes

See also 
 List of colonial and departmental heads of Réunion
 List of colonial governors in 2006
 List of colonial governors in 2007

Living people
1948 births
People from Saint-Denis, Réunion
Sciences Po alumni
Prefects of France
Prefects of Dordogne
Prefects of Saône-et-Loire
Prefects of Côtes-d'Armor
Prefects of Réunion
Prefects of Val-d'Oise
Prefects of Seine-Maritime
Commandeurs of the Légion d'honneur
Officers of the Ordre du Mérite Maritime